All Light, Everywhere is an 2021 American documentary film, written and directed by Theo Anthony. It follows the biases on how humans see things, focusing primarily on the use of police body cameras.

The film had its world premiere at the Sundance Film Festival on January 31, 2021, where the film won the U.S. Documentary Special Jury Award for Nonfiction Experimentation. It was released on June 4, 2021, by Super LTD.

Synopsis
The film follows the biases inherent to the way humans physically see the world, focusing primarily on the usage of police body cameras and other forms of police surveillance, but also tracing studies of solar eclipses as well as the parallel development of automatic weapons with the motion picture camera.

Release
The film had its world premiere at the Sundance Film Festival on January 31, 2021. Shortly after, Super LTD, the boutique film division of Neon, acquired U.S. distribution rights to the film. It was released on June 4, 2021.

Reception
All Light, Everywhere received positive reviews from film critics. It holds a 93% rating on review aggregator website Rotten Tomatoes, based on 57 reviews, with a weighted average of 7.90/10. The site’s critical consensus reads, “ All Light, Everywhere poses thought-provoking questions about our view of objective reality -- and the implications for our growing reliance on surveillance technology”. On Metacritic, the film holds a rating of 74 out of 100, based on 9 critics, indicating "generally favorable reviews". The Hollywood Reporter picked the film to be among the best of films released so far in 2021 as of early July 2021.

References

External links
 
 

2021 films
American documentary films
Neon (distributor) films
2021 documentary films
2020s English-language films
2020s American films